Periglypta listeri, or the princess Venus clam, is a species of bivalve mollusc in the family Veneridae. It can be found along the Atlantic coast of North America, ranging from southern Florida to the West Indies.

References

Veneridae
Bivalves described in 1838
Taxa named by John Edward Gray